Alcanzar una estrella II is the second soundtrack album from the telenovela Alcanzar una estrella II, released by Discos Melody. It was released as the telenovela was coming to an end in June 1991.

The telenovela's fictional pop band Muñecos de Papel was formed by Sasha, Ricky Martin, Bibi Gaytan, Pedro Fernandez, Erick Rubin and Angelica Rivera.

This album includes the voices of Bibi Gaytan and Erick Rubin - both Bibi and Erick had been omitted from the Muñecos de Papel album, released months earlier by Sony. It is, however, unclear whether Sasha, Pedro Fernandez and Angelica Rivera contributed backing vocals to the only group song in Alcanzar una estrella II, "No quiero dejar de brillar" - Bibi Gaytan, Erick Rubin and Ricky Martin all have solo verses but the other members do not, and the credits do not include this information.

"No quiero dejar de brillar" did not achieve the success of the group's previous single "Muñeco de Papel". The song is not attributed to the fictional band Muñecos de Papel, but instead it's credited to "Estrellas de Alcanzar una Estrella" (Stars from Alcanzar una Estrella) - which might indicate that it was not recorded by all six members of the group. Further evidence is the fact that there are no Muñecos de Papel photos in the artwork, and the back cover only features Gaytan and Rubin (then under contract with Melody), as well as other cast members who were not part of Muñecos de Papel but did contribute songs: Angelica Ruvalcaba, Marisa De Lille and Hector Suarez Gomis. There are no images of Sasha, Martin, Fernandez or Rivera.

The album was not as successful as Muñecos de Papel; still, Bibi Gaytan had her first solo hit with the single "Tan solo una mujer". No further singles were released.

Track listing
 "NO QUIERO DEJAR DE BRILLAR" – Estrellas de Alcanzar una Estrella
 "TAN SOLO UNA MUJER" – Bibi Gaytán
 "ASÍ QUIERO QUE SEA MI VIDA" – Marisa De Lile
 "REBELDÍA" – Marisa De Lille
 "HACIA EL VIENTO" Erick Rubin
 "EXTRAÑO SER NIÑA" – Angélica Ruvalcaba
 "CONTAMINACIÓN" Erick Rubin
 "UN LUGAR DONDE VIVIR" – Hector Suarez Gomis
 "SOLO QUIERO QUE ME VUELVAS A  QUERER" Bibi Gaytán
 "ENERGÍA ES AMOR" – Microchips
 "EN UN METRO" Erick Rubin
 "FÍJATE EN MI"  Bibi Gaytán

1991 albums